Gert Hendrik Muller (born 5 February 1986) is a South African professional rugby union player. He currently plays at prop at Stade Toulousain in the French Top 14.

References

External links
Ligue Nationale De Rugby Profile
European Professional Club Rugby Profile
Bayonne Profile

1986 births
South African rugby union players
Living people
Golden Lions players
Lions (United Rugby Championship) players
Aviron Bayonnais players
SU Agen Lot-et-Garonne players
Rugby union props